Utica is a small rural unincorporated community and census-designated place in Daviess County, Kentucky, in the United States. Utica has a post office, a fire station, a cemetery, several churches, a gas station, a store called JR's Market, and a Dollar General store. Utica was probably founded in the early 1800s and named after the City of Utica, New York. Mill Street which is the first side road on Hwy 140 West was named after the flour mill that was located behind JR's Market. Mill short cuts back to US Hwy 431 where it ends. The first property on Mill Street was a passenger train station in the late 1800s to early 1900s that ferried people to the river town of Owensboro across the border from Indiana. Just past Mill Street is Highway 1207 that runs to "old" Highway 81 that leads right into and around downtown Owensboro. By driving past Hwy 1207, Hwy 140 goes up Graveyard hill, named so by the locals. A steep incline of 45 degrees for a quarter mile and ends at the top where there is a cemetery. This cemetery consists of people from the local community as early as the early 1900s but most are from the 1930s and upward. It is still used to this day.

References

Census-designated places in Kentucky
Census-designated places in Daviess County, Kentucky